Bart Ramselaar (born 29 June 1996) is a Dutch professional footballer who plays as a midfielder for FC Utrecht in the Eredivisie.

Club career
Ramselaar came off the bench on 15 April 2018 as PSV beat rivals Ajax 3–0 to clinch the 2017–18 Eredivisie title.

International career
Ramselaar received his first call up to represent the senior Netherlands team in May 2016 for friendly matches against Ireland, Poland and Austria.

Honours
PSV
 Eredivisie: 2017–18

References

External links
 
 Voetbal International profile 
 

1996 births
Living people
Sportspeople from Amersfoort
Dutch footballers
Footballers from Utrecht (province)
Association football midfielders
Netherlands international footballers
Netherlands under-21 international footballers
Netherlands youth international footballers
Eredivisie players
Eerste Divisie players
FC Utrecht players
PSV Eindhoven players
Jong PSV players
20th-century Dutch people
21st-century Dutch people